The 80th Flying Training Wing was a training wing of the United States Army Air Forces.  It was last assigned to the Central Flying Training Command, and was disbanded on 16 June 1946 at Ellington Field, Texas.

There is no lineage between the United States Air Force 80th Flying Training Wing, established on 13 January 1942 as the 80th Pursuit Group (Interceptor) at Selfridge Field, Michigan and this organization.

History
The wing controlled three navigation schools in Texas, and also supported the AAF Glider Pilot School at South Plains.
After graduation, Flying Cadets were commissioned as Second Lieutenants, received their "wings" and were reassigned to Operational or Replacement Training Units operated by one of the four Numbered Air Forces in the Zone of Interior (ZI).

Lineage
 Established as 80th Flying Training Wing on 14 August 1943
 Activated on 25 August 1943
 Disbanded on 16 June 1946.

Assignments
 Army Air Forces Central Flying Training Command, 25 August 1943 – 16 June 1946.

Training aircraft
The schools of the wing used Beechcraft AT-7s for navigation training.  Glider training focused on the Waco CG-4A, along with various tow planes to get the gliders airborne.

Assigned Schools

 Ellington Field, Houston, Texas
 AAF Advanced Navigation School
 68th Navigation Training Group
 Opened: January 1942, Closed: November 1945 (AT-7)
 Remained open after the war as Ellington AFB, closed 1976, now TX ANG base

 Hondo Army Air Field, Hondo, Texas
 AAF Advanced Navigation School
 87th Navigation Training Group
 Opened: July 1942, Closed: December 1945 (AT-7)
 Closed December 1945; opened 1951.  Later Hondo Air Base, closed 1958; still used for flight screening program

 San Marcos Army Airfield, San Marcos, Texas
 AAF Advanced Navigation School
 Opened: January 1943, Closed: September 1945 (AT-7)
 Reopened 1951 as Gary Air Force Base.  Closed 1963

 South Plains Army Airfield, Lubbock, Texas
 AAF Glider School
 64th Two-Engine Flying Training Group
 Opened: August 1942, Closed: November 1944 (A-25, AT-17, CG-4, L-4, TG-1, TG-5)

Stations
 San Marcos Army Airfield, Texas, 25 August 1943
 Ellington Field, Texas, 1 January 1945 – 16 June 1946

See also

 Army Air Forces Training Command
 Other Central Flying Training Command Flight Training Wings:
 31st Flying Training Wing (World War II) Primary Flight Training
 32d Flying Training Wing (World War II) Basic Flight Training
 33d Flying Training Wing (World War II) Advanced Flight Training, Two Engine
 34th Flying Training Wing (World War II) Bombardier and Specialized Two/Four-Engine Training
 77th Flying Training Wing (World War II) Advanced Flight Training, Single Engine
 78th Flying Training Wing (World War II) Classification/Preflight Unit
 79th Flying Training Wing (World War II) Gunnery

References

Military units and formations established in 1943
Military units and formations disestablished in 1946
Training wings of the United States Army Air Forces
1943 establishments in Texas
1946 disestablishments in Texas